Béraud is a French surname. It may refer to:

Henri Béraud, (1885–1958), French writer
Jean Béraud, (1849–1935), French artist
Luc Béraud (born 1945), French filmmaker

See also
Beraud, Torbeck, Haiti
Berard

French-language surnames